Telfair Arms Apartments, formerly Telfair Hospital, is a historic building constructed in 1886 in Savannah, Georgia. It was designed by Alfred Eichberg.

References

Residential buildings completed in 1886
Apartment buildings in Georgia (U.S. state)
Residential buildings in Savannah, Georgia